Thandwe Township is a township of Thandwe District in the Rakhine State of Myanmar. The principal town is Thandwe.

Location

Geo
Thandwe Township is situated the south of Rakhine State. From east to west, it is 28.33 miles wide and from south to north it is 48 miles wide. The area is 1360.16 square miles or 870,504 acres or 3522,8 square km. There are surrounded by hill and above sea level is 18 feet.

Population

Family

House

Organization

Race
In Thandwe township, there are 5 Chinese men and 12 Pakistan men, 6 kachin,3 kayah, 8 kayin, 3663 chin, 554 Burma, 40 mon, 100947 rakhine, 8 shan and other 299 people.

Religious

There are 100871 Buddhists, 8761 Muslims, 3705 Christians and 5 Hindus.

Political party

There are 5 parties.

References

Townships of Rakhine State